The Invasion of Gozo took place in July 1551, and was accomplished by the Ottoman Empire against the island of Gozo, following an unsuccessful attempt to conquer nearby Malta on 18 July 1551. It was followed by a victorious campaign with the siege of Tripoli.

Attack

Malta
The Commander of the Ottoman fleet was Sinan Pasha, accompanied by Salah Rais and Dragut Reis. The Ottomans initially landed on Malta, at Marsamxett, and a force of 10,000 men marched upon Birgu and Fort St Angelo, but they realised that these were too well fortified to be conquered easily. Therefore, the Ottomans turned their attention to Mdina, looting and burning the villages on the way. Meanwhile, the Knights in Mdina, under the command of Fra Villeganion, asked the people living in the villages to seek refuge in the city and to help defend it. When the Ottomans arrived they discovered a large garrison defending the city so they decided against the plan of attacking the city since they did not want to fight a long siege. Meanwhile, a relief fleet attacked the Ottoman ships anchored at Marsamxett.

Gozo
The Ottoman then decided to attack nearby Gozo, which was under the command of Governor Gelatian de Sessa. After a few days of bombardment, de Sessa attempted to negotiate with Sinan Pasha, however the latter rejected the terms. A few days later the citadel capitulated. About 300 people escaped from the citadel by climbing down its walls and hid from the Ottomans. The other 6,000 people, including Governor de Sessa and the Knights, were taken captive and ended up in slavery, being sailed to Tripoli on 30 July. The Ottomans only spared a monk and forty elderly Gozitans.

According to legend, one of the defenders named Bernardo Dupuo (also known as Bernardo da Fonte or de Opuo) fought bravely when Ottomans breached the city walls, and killed his own wife and two daughters preferring death over slavery before he himself was killed by the invading forces. A street in the citadel is named after him, and outside his house lies a plaque commemorating his death.

Consequences
Since few Christians remained on Gozo, families from Malta were encouraged by the Order of Saint John to repopulate the island. However it took about 150 years for the population to reach pre-1551 levels. A few Gozitans managed to redeem themselves from slavery, such as the notable Reverend Lorenzo de Apapis, who returned to Gozo in 1554.

Following the attack the Order set up a commission made up of Leone Strozzi and Pietro Pardo, who were engineers, to examine the Maltese Islands' fortifications and make suggestions for further improvements. The Grandmaster, Juan de Homedes, increased taxation and strengthened the coastal guards, the Dejma. Following Strozzi and Pardo's commission, Fort Saint Michael and Fort Saint Elmo were built to better defend the Grand Harbour. Bastions at Mdina and Birgu were strengthened, and the fortifications of Senglea were built.

The failure to take all of the Maltese Islands was also one of the causes of the Great Siege of Malta in 1565. Two other unsuccessful attacks were made on Gozo in 1613 and 1709.

During the sacking of Gozo, the archives of the Università were destroyed by the Ottomans. The only surviving pre-1551 records relating to Gozo are a few documents in the Notarial Archives as well as some records in the archives of Palermo, Sicily.

Legacy

A re-enactment of the invasion was made by Grade 5 students of San Andrea School in 1997, and a video entitled A Tale of a Gozitan City was released. The students played the roles of Turkish invaders, Knights, or Maltese peasants and filming was done on the schooner Charlotte Louise.

Din l-Art Ħelwa produced a musical account of the invasion at Saint Michael's Bastion in the Citadel on 31 July 2009. This was centered on the legend of Don Bernardo de Opuo.

In 2013 a memorial to the siege was set up at the gardens of Villa Rundle in Victoria, Gozo.

The siege of Gozo features in Marthese Fenech's book Eight Pointed Cross (2011), part of her historical fictional series set in Malta.

The invasion of Gozo features prominently in Dorothy Dunnett's book The Disorderly Knights (1966), part of her fictional series Lymond Chronicles.

Notes

Conflicts in 1551
Gozo
Gozo (1551)
Gozo (1551)
1551 in Malta
Invasions by the Ottoman Empire in Europe
History of the Sovereign Military Order of Malta